"Between the Wheels" is a song by the Canadian rock band Rush. It was released on their 1984 album Grace Under Pressure.

Composition and recording
"Between the Wheels" was composed in the key of A minor, and is played in common time.

News stories from the Toronto-based newspaper The Globe and Mail inspired the song's lyrics.

The line "Another lost generation" is from a quote by Gertrude Stein used by Ernest Hemingway at the beginning of The Sun Also Rises.

Bill Banasiewicz in the book Rush Visions said: "Between the Wheels" is about pressure, and returns to the gloom of much of the rest of Grace Under Pressure. Alex's guitar really jumps out. A lyric from the song puts across what they all must have felt at the time. "We can go from boom to bust . . . from dreams to a bowl of dust".

Reception
Odyssey rated "Between the Wheels" 5/5, and called the song's guitar solo excellent, and wrote that it had "terrific emotion". Odyssey also praised the intro, writing that it starts with an "unsettling synth", and that "Neil's drumming is powerful from the start. Lifeson's guitar is outstanding and full of life from the beginning. Geddy's vocal delivery is outstanding as he sings with that personality and passion that makes him great".

Ultimate Classic Rock ranked the song number 80 on their list of "All 167 Rush Songs Ranked Worst to Best", writing "there's nothing wrong with 'Between the Wheels', but it's hard to shake the feeling that Rush – and, well, other bands – have presented this same song more effectively in the past".

Louder ranked the song number 47 on their list of the top 50 Rush songs.

References

1984 songs
Songs written by Geddy Lee
Songs written by Alex Lifeson
Songs written by Neil Peart
Rush (band) songs